Anarchism without adjectives (from the Spanish ), in the words of historian George Richard Esenwein, "referred to an unhyphenated form of anarchism, that is, a doctrine without any qualifying labels such as communist, collectivist, mutualist, or individualist. For others, [...] [it] was simply understood as an attitude that tolerated the coexistence of different anarchist schools".

Origins 

The originators of the expression were Fernando Tarrida del Mármol and Ricardo Mella, who were troubled by the bitter debates between mutualist, individualist and communist anarchists in the 1880s.  Using the phrase "anarchism without adjectives" was an attempt to show greater tolerance between anarchist tendencies and to be clear that anarchists should not impose a preconceived economic plan on anyone—even in theory. Anarchists without adjectives tended either to reject all particular anarchist economic models as faulty, or take a pluralist position of embracing them all to a limited degree in order that they may keep one another in check. Regardless, to these anarchists the economic preferences are considered to be of "secondary importance" to abolishing all coercive authority, with free experimentation the one rule of a free society.

History 

The theoretical perspective known as anarquismo sin adjetivos was one of the by-products of an intense debate within the movement of anarchism itself. The roots of the argument can be found in the development of anarcho-communism after Mikhail Bakunin's death in 1876. While not entirely dissimilar to collectivist anarchism (as can be seen from James Guillaume's famous work "On Building the New Social Order" within Bakunin on anarchism, the collectivists did see their economic system evolving into free communism), communist anarchists developed, deepened and enriched Bakunin's work just as Bakunin had developed, deepened and enriched PIerre-Joseph Proudhon's. Communist anarchism was associated with such anarchists as Élisée Reclus, Carlo Cafiero, Errico Malatesta and (most famously) Peter Kropotkin.

Anarcho-communist ideas replaced collectivist anarchism as the main anarchist tendency in Europe, except in Spain. Here the major issue was not the question of communism (although for Ricardo Mella this played a part), but a question of the modification of strategy and tactics implied by communist anarchism. At this time (the 1880s), the anarcho-communists stressed local cells of anarchist militants, generally opposed trade unionism as were characterized by a degree of anti-organisation. Such a change in strategy and tactics came in for a lot of discussion from the Spanish collectivists who strongly supported working class organisation and struggle.

This debate soon spread outside of Spain and the discussion found its way into the pages of La Revolte in Paris. This provoked many anarchists to agree with Malatesta's argument that "[i]t is not right for us, to say the least, to fall into strife over mere hypotheses". Over time, most anarchists agreed (to use Max Nettlau's words) that "we cannot foresee the economic development of the future" and so started to stress what they had in common, rather than the different visions of how a free society would operate. As time progressed, most anarcho-communists saw that ignoring the labour movement ensured that their ideas did not reach the working class while most anarcho-communists stressed their commitment to communist ideals and their arrival sooner, rather than later, after a revolution.

United States 

Similarly, in the United States there was an intense debate at the same time between individualist and communist anarchists. There, Benjamin Tucker was arguing that anarcho-communists were not anarchists while Johann Most was similarly dismissing Tucker's ideas. Troubled by the "bitter debates" between anarchists from divergent schools of economic thought, those who did not see a need to confine themselves to one particular school of thought called for more tolerance among anarchists, with some of them explicitly terming it "anarchism without adjectives".

For example, early feminist Voltairine de Cleyre labelled herself as simply "anarchist" and called on others to adopt an "anarchism without adjectives" until enough experimental examples were tried in different localities to determine its most appropriate form. De Cleyre sought conciliation between the various schools and said in her essay Anarchism:There is nothing un-Anarchistic about any of [these systems] until the element of compulsion enters and obliges unwilling persons to remain in a community whose economic arrangements they do not agree to. (When I say 'do not agree to' I do not mean that they have a mere distaste for...I mean serious differences which in their opinion threaten their essential liberties...)...Therefore I say that each group of persons acting socially in freedom may choose any of the proposed systems, and be just as thorough-going Anarchists as those who select another.Historically, anarchists who embraced "anarchism without adjectives" objected to capitalism from the original use of the term as a call for tolerance amongst collectivist and communist anarchists, all of whom rejected capitalism. Voltairine de Cleyre was also of this bent and when commenting on the McKinley assassination wrote: "The hells of capitalism create the desperate; the desperate act—desperately!". In lamenting the present difficulty in abolishing private property, Malatesta wrote that "[...] this does not prevent us now, or will it in the future, from continually opposing capitalism or any other form of despotism".

See also 
Synthesis anarchism

References

Bibliography 
 
 
 
  
 

 
Without adjectives